In helicopters the rotorhead is the part of the rotor assembly that joins the blades to the shaft, cyclic and collective mechanisms.  It is sometimes referred to as the rotor "hub". The rotorhead is where the lift force from the rotor blades act. The rotorhead is connected to the main drive shaft via the jesus bolt, and houses several other components such as the swash plate, flight control linkages and fly-bars.  The rotor hub is also where the centre of gravity acts on the helicopter.

Types 
Rotorheads can be classified into 3 main types:
 Articulated
 Semi-Rigid
 Rigid

Articulated Rotorhead
An articulated rotorhead system is one where the individual blades are free to flap, lag and change pitch. This is done by mounting the blades on flapping and lagging hinges and pitch change bearings.

Semi-Rigid
A semi-rigid rotorhead does not have individual flapping or drag hinges but provides for flapping and lag motion through gimbal mounting.  A common example of a semi-rigid rotor is a teetering rotorhead found on the Robinson family of helicopters.

Rigid
A rigid rotorhead has no flapping or lag hinges but does have pitch change bearings. The flapping and lagging movement is accommodated by flexible sections (commonly elastomeric bearings) at the blade root or blade attachment. When using composite blades, the blades can also flex to provide a flapping motion.A main rotor head that has no facility fhir the rotor blade tio flap or drag.

Benefits of rigid rotor system are:
 Less control response lag
 Reduced maintenance

References

Helicopter components